Tetrachlorodinitroethane is a chlorinated nitroalkane produced by nitration of tetrachloroethylene with dinitrogen tetroxide or fuming nitric acid. It's a powerful lachrymatory agent and pulmonary agent that is six times more toxic than chloropicrin. Tetrachlorodinitroethane may be used as a fumigant.

See also
Chloropicrin
Trifluoronitrosomethane
Trichloronitrosomethane

References

Nitro compounds
Organochlorides
Lachrymatory agents
Pulmonary agents
Fumigants